The Johns Hopkins Center for Talented Youth (CTY) is a gifted education program for school-age children founded in 1979 by psychologist Julian Stanley at Johns Hopkins University. It was established as a research study into how academically advanced children learn and became the first program to identify academically talented students through above-grade-level testing and provide them with challenging learning opportunities. CTY offers summer, online, and family programs to students from around the world and has nearly 30,000 program enrollments annually. CTY is accredited for students in grades K to 12 by the Middle States Association of Colleges and Schools.

CTY published the Imagine magazine that provided educational opportunities and resources and student-written content for middle and high school students. The magazine was discontinued in June 2018.

History 

In 2022, about one-third of CTY's summer sessions were canceled due to a lack of staffing and staff background checks not clearing in time.

Admission requirements 
CTY first requires students to sign up for an account and membership, which costs $50 for U.S. students and $60 for international students. They must then submit scores from a qualifying test to determine if they are at "Advanced CTY-Level" (defined as showing ability four grade levels above current enrolled grade) or "CTY-Level" (defined as showing ability two grade levels above current enrolled grade). Eligible test scores include the SCAT, PSAT, SAT, ACT, and STB (Spatial Test Battery). Students receive their course eligibility results online.

Operation

Governance

Sites

Programming

Reception 

Former CTY executive director Elaine Tuttle Hansen (2011-2018) was interviewed by National Public Radio and published on the Opinion-Editorial pages of The Chronicle of Higher Education, The New York Times, and The Baltimore Sun.

In July 2004, CTY was featured in an article in The New Yorker.

In 2006, the camp was shown in an hour-long CNN special on gifted children.

Notable alumni

Notable CTY alumni include:
 Six of 32 American Recipients of the 2006 Rhodes Scholarship
 Lady Gaga, musician, actress
 Sergey Brin, co-founder of Google
 George Hotz, hacker and founder of comma.ai
 Hollis Robbins, academic and essayist 
 Evanna Lynch, who portrays Luna Lovegood in the Harry Potter movies, attended the Irish Centre For Talented Youth in Dublin
 Gary Marcus, a research psychologist and the author of Kluge
 Mark Zuckerberg, founder of Facebook and Time Person of the Year 2010
 Terence Tao, 2006 Fields Medal recipient
 Elissa Hallem, 2012 MacArthur Fellows Program, or Genius Grant for neurobiology
 Jacob Lurie, 2014 MacArthur Fellows Program, or Genius Grant for mathematics
 Dave Aitel, computer security professional
 Ronan Farrow, journalist, lawyer, and former government advisor
 Andrew Yang, Democratic candidate for 2021 New York City Mayor election
Marques Brownlee, YouTube technology reviewer
Curtis Yarvin, blogger also known by the pen name Mencius Moldbug

See also

 Centre for the Talented Youth of Ireland
 Gifted
 Gifted Education
 Imagine Magazine
 Johns Hopkins University
 Dr. Julian Stanley

References

External links
CTY Official Website
Unofficial CTY Student-Based Wiki

Gifted education
Summer camps in the United States
Middle States Commission on Secondary Schools
1979 establishments in Maryland